The Holladay Nunataks are a cluster of nunataks  in extent, occupying the central part of the peninsula between the terminus of Tomilin Glacier and the Gillett Ice Shelf. They were mapped by the United States Geological Survey from surveys and U.S. Navy air photos, 1960–63, and were named by the Advisory Committee on Antarctic Names for Billy W. Holladay, Chief Aviation Electronics Technician, U.S. Navy, who was Maintenance Control Chief at McMurdo Station during Operation Deep Freeze, 1968.

References

Nunataks of Oates Land